Bryson is a surname. Notable people with the surname include:

Alexander Bryson (1816–1866), Scottish biologist, geologist, and horologist
Andrew Bryson (1822–1892), American admiral
Ann Bryson (born 1964), British actress
Arthur E. Bryson Jr., American professor of engineering, the "father of modern optimal control theory"
Bernarda Bryson Shahn (1903–2004), formerly Bernarda Bryson, American painter and lithographer, the widow of artist Ben Shahn
Bill Bryson (born 1951), American author
Bill Bryson (politician) (1898–1973), Australian politician
Bill Bryson Sr. (1915–1986), American sports journalist
Craig Bryson (born 1986), Scottish footballer
Dean F. Bryson (1910–1995), American attorney, 77th Associate Justice of the Oregon Supreme Court
E. Brent Bryson (born 1957), American attorney
George Bryson Jr. (1852–1937), Quebec lumber merchant and political figure
George Bryson Sr. (1813–1900), Scottish-born businessman and political figure in Quebec
Hugh Alexander Bryson (1912–1987), Canadian politician, farmer, and insurance agent
Ian Bryson (born 1962), Scottish footballer
Isla Bryson, Scottish transgender criminal
Jacob Bryson (born 1997), Canadian ice hockey player
Jeanie Bryson (born 1958), American singer
Jennifer S. Bryson, American academic
Jim Bryson, Canadian singer/songwriter
Jim Bryson (politician) (born 1961), American politician from Tennessee
John Bryson (disambiguation), various people
Joseph R. Bryson (1893–1953), American politician from South Carolina
Lindsay Bryson (1925–2005), British admiral
Lyman Bryson (1888–1959), American educator and media adviser
Marian Bryson (?), All-American Girls Professional Baseball League player
Michael Bryson (1942–2012), American news and sports reporter and editor
Oliver Bryson (1896–1977), British fighter ace, Royal Air Force officer, and George Cross recipient
P. Miles Bryson (born 1964), American collage and sound artist
Paul Bryson (born 1968), English cricketer
Peabo Bryson (born 1951), American singer-songwriter
Reid Bryson (1920–2008), American atmospheric scientist, meteorologist, geologist, and professor
Rudi Bryson (born 1968), South African cricketer
Shawn Bryson (born 1976), American football professional player
Thomas Bryson (1826–1882), Quebec merchant and political figure
William Bryson (disambiguation), various people
Winifred Bryson (1892–1987), American actress
Fictional characters include:
Denise/Dennis Bryson, in the television series Twin Peaks